F.C. Babaque is a Bissau-Guinean football club based in Farim. They play in the 2 division in Guinean football, the Campeonato Nacional da Guine-Bissau.

Babaque